Dimitris Lyacos (born 19 October 1966) is a contemporary Greek poet and playwright. He is the author of the Poena Damni trilogy. Lyacos's work is characterised by its genre-defying form and the avant-garde combination of  themes from literary tradition with elements from ritual, religion, philosophy and anthropology.

The trilogy interchanges prose, drama and poetry in a fractured narrative that reflects some of the principal motifs of the Western Canon. Despite its length - the overall text counts no more than two hundred pages - the work took over a period of thirty years to  complete, with the individual books revised and republished in different editions during this period and arranged around a cluster of concepts including the scapegoat, the quest, the return of the dead, redemption, physical suffering, mental illness. Lyacos's characters are always at a distance from society as such, fugitives, like the narrator of Z213: Exit, outcasts in a dystopian hinterland like the characters in With the People from the Bridge, or marooned, like the protagonist of The First Death whose struggle for survival unfolds on a desert-like island. Poena Damni has been construed as an "allegory of unhappiness" together with works of authors such as Gabriel Garcia Marquez and Thomas Pynchon and has been acknowledged as an exponent of the postmodern sublime as well as one of the notable anti-utopian works of the 21st century.

Life 
Lyacos was born and raised in Athens, where he studied law. From 1988 to 1991 he lived in Venice. In 1992 he moved to London. He studied philosophy at University College London with analytical philosophers Ted Honderich and Tim Crane focusing on Epistemology and Metaphysics, Ancient Greek philosophy and Wittgenstein. In 2005 he moved to Berlin. He is currently based in Berlin and Athens.

Career 
In 1992, Lyacos set about writing a trilogy under the collective name Poena Damni, referring to the hardest trial the condemned souls in Hell have to endure, i.e. the loss of the vision of God. The trilogy has developed gradually as a work in progress in the course of thirty years. The third part (The First Death) appeared first in Greek (Ο πρώτος θάνατος) and was later translated into English, Spanish and German. The second part under the title "Nyctivoe" was initially published in 2001 in Greek and German, and came out in English in 2005. This work was substituted in 2014 by a new version under the title With the People from the Bridge. 

Various artists have brought Lyacos' work in different artistic media. Austrian artist Sylvie Proidl presented a series of paintings in 2002 in Vienna. In 2004, a sound and sculpture installation by sculptor Fritz Unegg and BBC producer Piers Burton-Page went on a European tour. In 2005 Austrian visual artist Gudrun Bielz presented a video-art work inspired by Nyctivoe. The Myia dance company performed a contemporary dance version of Nyctivoe in Greece from 2006 to 2009. A music/theatre version of Z213: Exit by Greek composers Maria Aloupi and Andreas Diktyopoulos, performed by Das Neue Ensemble and Greek actor Dimitris Lignadis was presented in 2013. Two contemporary classical music compositions inspired by the trilogy, "Night and Day in the Tombs"and "The Un-nailing of our Childhood Years", by The Asinine Goat were released in February and June 2022 respectively.
Dimitris Lyacos was Guest International Poet with Les Murray in 1998 Poetryfest International Poetry Festival, Aberystwyth, Wales. Henceforth he has conducted readings and has lectured on his work at various universities worldwide, including Oxford, Trieste, Hong Kong and Nottingham. In 2012 he was Writer in Residence at the International Writing Program, University of Iowa. He is one of the most recent Greek authors to have achieved international recognition, Poena Damni being the most widely reviewed Greek literary work of the recent decades and Z213: Exit, arguably, the best-selling book of contemporary Greek poetry in English translation. Lyacos was guest author at the International Literature Festival of Tbilisi in 2017 In 2018 he represented Greece in the Transpoesie Festival, Brussels. He was guest author at the 2020 International Literary Festival of Prishtina and at the 2022 Bucharest International Poetry Festival.
Until autumn 2022 Lyacos's work was translated in 21 languages with the full trilogy having appeared in 7 languages, being thus the most extensively translated work of contemporary Greek Literature in the new millenium. The Italian version of the trilogy was voted by Indiscreto Journal among the ten most important poetry books published in Italy in 2022.

Poena Damni

Summary/Context
The trilogy would appear to belong to a context of tragic poetry and epic drama, albeit distinctly postmodern at the same time. It explores the deep structure of tragedy instead of its formal characteristics, having thus been called a post-tragic work.  Homer, Aeschylus and Dante as well as the darker aspects of romantic poetry together with symbolism, expressionism, and an intense religious and philosophical interest permeate the work. Poena Damni has thus been related, despite its postmodern traits, more to the High Modernist tradition of James Joyce and Virginia Woolf The first of the three pieces, Z213: Exit, accounts a man's escape from a guarded city and his journey through dreamlike, sometimes nightmarish, lands. In the second book, With the People from the Bridge the protagonist of Z213: Exit becomes a first-degree Narrator appearing as one spectator in a makeshift play performed under the arches of a derelict train station. The third book, The First Death opens with a marooned man on a rocky island and details his struggle for survival as well as the disintegration of his body and the unrolling of its memory banks.

Survey

The work is hard to classify since it crosses the usual boundaries of genre. Z213: Exit re-contextualizes elements from the greater Greek canon – including the escaped hero and the devote wanderer. It often takes narrative form, mixing poetry and prose. The trilogy moves into dramatic representation of character and situation in With the People from the Bridge, and subsequently to a hard lyrical kind of poetry used to depict the break-up and eventual apotheosis of the body in The First Death. The possibilities of divergence between the perceived and the objective outside world are exploited; the reader follows the irregular flow of internal monologues stemming from events in the external world but ultimately viewed as reflected onto the thinking and feeling surfaces of the protagonist's mind. On the other hand, an alien setting and the unfolding, dreamlike occurrences are presented with impressive solidity, pointing to an alternative reality, or, unveiling a hidden dimension of the world. From that perspective, the work has been interpreted as a kind of surfiction whereby the world depicted within the trilogy  allows an open space for the reader to contribute his own internalized version.

Z213: Exit

Z213: Exit uses the device of the palimpsest to present a fictional tissue combining elements of both ancient and modern sources as well as the "dialogue" of its two protagonists. It is composed of a series of fragmented entries in a fictional diary recording the experiences of an unnamed protagonist during a train journey into an unknown land. The man has been released - or escaped - from some time of confinement elliptically described in his journal and reminiscent of a hospital, prison, ghetto or enclave of some sort. His subsequent wanderings among desolate landscapes on the verge of reality are set in a closely detailed, and somehow Kafkaesque, atmosphere, underlining the point that the most dreamlike occurrences are also the realest. Along the way, the protagonist delves deeper in what seems like a quasi-religious quest while, at the same time, his growing impression of being stalked introduces an element of suspense and a film noir-like quality. Thus, the text hinges on the metaphysical but is also reminiscent of an L.A. private eye in a 1940s detective novel closing upon an extraordinary discovery. Z213: Exit ends with a description of a sacrifice where the protagonist and a "hungry band feasting" roast a lamb on a spit, cutting and skinning its still bleating body and removing its entrails as if observing a sacred rite.

With the People from the Bridge

With the People from the Bridge is fragmentary, hallucinatory, at once firmly rooted in a complex webwork of allusions and drifting free of referentiality, evading attempts to pin it down. The plot hinges on the story of a character resembling the Gerasene demoniac from St. Mark's gospel, living in a cemetery, tormented by demons, and cutting himself with stones. He enters the tomb of his dead lover attempting to open the coffin in which she seems to lie in a state not affected by decomposition and the urgency of his desire reanimates her body whose passage back to life is described. The grave becomes a "fine and private place" for lovers still capable of embracing.

The story recounts a multiperspectival narrative based on the theme of the revenant through the first-person embedded accounts of four characters: a man possessed by demons attempts to resurrect the body of his lover but ends in joining her in the grave. The action is enveloped in a context reminiscent of a festival for the dead  as well as that of a vampire epidemic. There are clear references to Christian tradition and eschatology and the piece results in a joint contemplation of collective salvation which is ultimately left unresolved after a final narrative twist.

The First Death

In The First Death a place is denied to the mutilated body which grinds against the rocks and suffers continuing degradation, physical and mental, as even the mechanisms of memory are dislocated. Yet the bond between person and body that ensures life still persists, and, "at that point without substance/ where the world collides and takes off", the mechanical instincts of the cosmos rumble into action and sling this irreducible substance again into space - prompting, perhaps, a future regeneration.

From trilogy to tetralogy: Until the Victim Becomes our Own
In an interview with Lyacos for 3:AM Magazine, translator Andrew Barrett announced that he is in the process of translating the author's new work-in-project, titled Until the Victim Becomes our Own, which is conceived as the "zeroth" book that will convert Poena Damni into a tetralogy. According to Barrett, the new book explores bloodshed as the building-block in the formation of society and the eventual place of the individual in a world "permeated by institutionalized violence."

The interviews
Lyacos's literary output is complemented by a series of interviews that aim to function as a conceptual companion to his work and, at the same time, informally expand on a variety of literature-related subjects as well as philosophy, religion, cinema and the arts. These interviews have appeared on an annual basis in outlets including World Literature Today (A World to Be Repaired - 2021), 3:AM Magazine (Entangled Narratives and Dionysian Frenzy - 2020), Los Angeles Review of Books (Neighboring Yet Alien - 2019), BOMB (A Dissociated Locus - 2018), Berfrois (Controlled Experience - 2018), Gulf Coast (An Interview with Dimitris Lyacos - 2018). and The Bitter Oleander (2016)

Critical reception
Poena Damni is, arguably, one of the most widely and best reviewed work of contemporary Greek literature in translation with its various editions having received 80 international reviews until winter 2023, and mentioned as "one of the most-discussed and most-lauded pieces of contemporary European literature". It has been noted for creatively surpassing the distinction between modernism and postmodernism while, at the same time, being founded on a large variety of canonical texts of Western Literature. Most critics comment on the use of an intricate network of textual references and paraphrases of classical and biblical works, in tandem with the work's unconventional style and character. On a different note, one critic, pointed out that "despite it being beautifully written and heart-wrenching, the gruesome detail of some passages filled [her] with a sense of dread at the turning of every page" and issued a content warning for readers. In the light of the COVID-19 pandemic, Poena Damni has attracted attention as "a vertiginous work that is at once archetypal, transcendent, and uniquely suited to this particular moment in time".
The trilogy has given rise to scholarly criticism and is also part of various university curricula on postmodern fiction, while Lyacos has been mentioned for the Nobel Prize in Literature.

Further reading
Selected criticism
A 6000 words essay by Robert Zaller, analyzing Lyacos's trilogy in the Journal of Poetics Research

Selected interviews
A Dissociated Locus: Dimitris Lyacos Interviewed by Andrew Barrett.  BOMB, November 2018, New York, USA. 
A World to Be Repaired: A Conversation with Dimitris Lyacos  World Literature Today, October 2021, Oklahoma, USA.
An interview with the author in The Writing Disorder Magazine
Callie Michail interviews Dimitris Lyacos in Berfrois, November 2018, London, UK.
Entangled Narratives and Dionysian Frenzy: An interview with Dimitris Lyacos.  3:AM Magazine, September 2020, UK.
John Taylor interviews Dimitris Lyacos. Gulf Coast, Issue 30.1, Winter/Spring 2018, Houston USA, (pp. 277–286)
John Taylor interviews Dimitris Lyacos. New Walk, Issue 12, Spring/Summer 2016, Leicester UK.
Neighboring Yet Alien: An interview with Dimitris Lyacos.  Los Angeles Review of Books, September 2019, Los Angeles, USA.

Bibliography 
Poena Damni - German Edition. Translated by Nina-Maria Wanek. KLAK Verlag, Berlin 2020.
Poena Damni - Italian Edition. Translated by Viviana Sebastio. Il Saggiatore, Milan 2022.
Poena Damni - Portuguese/Brazilian Edition. Translated by Jose Luis Costa. Relicario Edicoes, Belo Horizonte, 2022.
Poena Damni - Turkish Edition. Translated by Arzu Eker. Can, Istanbul, 2022.
Poena Damni Der erste Tod. German edition. Translated by Nina-Maria Wanek. Verlagshaus J. Frank. First edition 2008. Second edition 2014. 
Poena Damni Nyctivoe. English edition. Translated by Shorsha Sullivan. Shoestring Press. 2005. 
Poena Damni Nyctivoe. Greek - German edition. Translated by Nina-Maria Jaklitsch. CTL Presse. Hamburg. 2001.
Poena Damni O Protos Thanatos. Odos Panos. Athens. 1996. 
Poena Damni The First Death, Second Edition (Revised). Translated by Shorsha Sullivan. Shoestring Press, Nottingham 2017. 
Poena Damni The First Death. English edition. Translated by Shorsha Sullivan. Shoestring Press. 2000. 
Poena Damni With the People from the Bridge, Second Edition (Revised). Translated by Shorsha Sullivan. Shoestring Press, Nottingham 2018. 
Poena Damni With the People from the Bridge. Translated by Shorsha Sullivan. Shoestring Press, Nottingham 2014. 
Poena Damni Z213: Exit, French Edition. Translated by Michel Volkovitch. Le Miel des Anges, 2017. 
Poena Damni Z213: Exit, Second Edition (Revised). Translated by Shorsha Sullivan. Shoestring Press, Nottingham 2016. 
Poena Damni Z213: Exit. English edition. Translated by Shorsha Sullivan. Shoestring Press 2010. 
Poena Damni Z213: ΕΞΟΔΟΣ. Greek Edition. Dardanos Publishers, Athens 2009. 
POENA DAMNI: THE TRILOGY. 3-Book Box Set Edition (English). Translated by Shorsha Sullivan. Shoestring Press, Nottingham 2018.

References

External links

 A video reading with the author (Greek subtitled in English) on YouTube
 
 

1966 births
Living people
Writers from Athens
Greek dramatists and playwrights
Writers
Postmodern writers
Modern Greek poets
Alumni of University College London
International Writing Program alumni
20th-century Greek poets